The Football Conference season of 1996–97 was the eighteenth season of the Football Conference, also known as the Vauxhall Conference for sponsorship reasons.

Overview
Macclesfield Town won their second Conference title in three years, and this time earned a promotion to the Football League – thanks to their upgraded stadium – at the expense of Hereford United.

New teams in the league this season
 Hayes (promoted 1995–96)
 Rushden & Diamonds (promoted 1995–96)

Final  league table

Results

Promotion and relegation

Promoted
 Macclesfield Town (to the Football League Third Division)
 Cheltenham Town (from the Southern Premier League)
 Leek Town (from the Northern Premier League)
 Yeovil Town (from the Isthmian League)

Relegated
 Hereford United (from the Football League Third Division)
 Altrincham (to the Northern Premier League)
 Bath City (to the Southern Premier League)
 Bromsgrove Rovers (to the Southern Premier League)

Top scorers in order of league goals

References

External links
 1996–97 Conference National Results

National League (English football) seasons
5